Iguala de la Independencia is one of the 81 municipalities of Guerrero, in south-western Mexico. The municipal seat lies at Iguala. The municipality covers an area of 567.1 km².

As of 2005, the municipality had a total population of 128,444

References

Municipalities of Guerrero